Avvakir is an old and uncommon Russian Christian male first name. It derives from the Biblical Hebrew word abba, meaning father, combined with the first name Kir.

Its diminutive is Kira. The patronymics derived from this first name are "" (Avvakirovich; masculine) and "" (Avvakirovna; feminine).

References

Notes

Sources
А. В. Суперанская (A. V. Superanskaya). "Словарь русских имён" (Dictionary of Russian Names). Издательство Эксмо. Москва, 2005. 
Н. А. Петровский (N. A. Petrovsky). "Словарь русских личных имён" (Dictionary of Russian First Names). ООО Издательство "АСТ". Москва, 2005. 

Russian masculine given names